New Horizons is the third studio album by American rock band Flyleaf, released on A&M/Octone Records on October 30, 2012. It was produced by Howard Benson, who has produced several of Flyleaf's previous recordings. It was the final album with lead vocalist Lacey Sturm, who announced her departure from the band, just prior to the album's release, in October 2012. Sturm rejoined the band in 2022.

Production
It was announced in February 2012 that Flyleaf had entered the studio with producer Howard Benson to start recording a new full-length studio album. A release date of October 30, 2012 was eventually confirmed for the album.

Singles
"New Horizons" is the album's first single and was released in the iTunes Store on August 21. However, the song made its radio debut on Windsor, Ontario rock station 89X on August 1. According to bassist Pat Seals, the song is about "a feeling of looking toward the unknown future with hope." Seals also described it as one of the band's best songs to date. A video was made for the song, and it was subsequently released on September 4, 2012. A second single, "Call You Out", was released later that month. Of the song, Seals said "[it] was one of the first songs written during the New Horizons sessions. The stomping opening verse evolved over time into this aggressive but very calculated track that closes with Sameer using chaotic guitar sounds to sort of burn it to the ground - engages you all the way through."

Track listing

Chart performance

Personnel
New Horizons album personnel adapted from the CD liner notes

 Lacey Sturm – lead vocals
 Sameer Bhattacharya – lead guitar, backing vocals
 Jared Hartmann – rhythm guitar
 James Culpepper – drums
 Pat Seals – bass, backing vocals
 Howard Benson – production
 Mike Plotnikoff – recording
 Tom Lord-Alge – mixing at South Beach Studios, Miami Beach, Florida
 Femio Hernandez – mixing assistant
 Ted Jensen – mastering at Sterling Sound, New York City
 Hatsukazu "Hatch" Inagaki – additional engineering
 Paul Decarli – digital editing, additional engineering
 Jimmy Fahey – assistant engineer

Album art
 Roi Hernandez – art direction
 Pat Seals – woodcut art
 Roi Hernandez – photography
 Alex Capaldi – photography

References

2012 albums
Albums produced by Howard Benson
Flyleaf (band) albums
A&M Octone Records albums